JS Ōsumi (LST-4001) is the lead ship of the s of the Japan Maritime Self-Defense Force (JMSDF).

Construction and career 
Ōsumi was laid down on 6 December 1995 and launched on 18 November 1996 by Mitsui Engineering & Shipbuilding, Tamano. She was commissioned into the 1st Landing Group on 11 March 1998.

Initially, the ship was not equipped with a fin stabilizer (rolling prevention device) that improves stability during open sea voyages and helicopter takeoffs and landings due to political judgment, and in 2006, eight years after commissioning, international emergency assistance was provided. The stabilizer installation cost was finally budgeted by the Defense Agency (currently the Ministry of Defense) as a repair cost for a large transport ship to respond to the activity, and at the same time the capacity of aviation fuel was increased. It was also equipped with a tactical air navigation system (TACAN), which was not available at the time of commissioning.

The return trip was scheduled to arrive at Kure on 22 November, but an issue that arose aboard Bungo delayed their arrival by one day. They arrived at Sasebo on the 22nd.

This ship delivered supplies to the disaster area after the 2011 Tohoku earthquake and tsunami.

From June to July 2012, she participated in the Pacific Partnership 2012, visited the Philippines and Vietnam, and engaged in medical activities and cultural exchanges. She left Kure on 18 November, arrived in Leyte Gulf on 22 November, carried out relief supplies transportation, medical care, and epidemic prevention activities, and returned to Japan on 20 December. In addition, Ōsumi was scheduled to participate in training for the defense of remote islands around Okinawa, but was redirected to provide support. The training was planned to be attended by 34,000 people, and Ōsumi was planned to be a base in the training area. The remote island defense training itself was canceled due to the dropout of Ōsumi.

On 15 January 2014, while en route from departure from Kure towards the Mitsui Tamano Shipyard for scheduled maintenance, Ōsumi was abnormally approached by the fishing boat Yugyosen, which tried to cross the tank landing ship a reckless route. Ōsumi repeatedly warned the fishing boat, slowed down but still collided with Yugyosen. The fishing boat capsized, four people on board were thrown into the sea and rescued by the Ōsumis crew, but two of them, the captain of the fishing boat and the angler died. Mutual embarkation training (cross-deck) was conducted with Dixmude.

For nine days, beginning on 5 May 2018, Ōsumi participated in multilateral joint training on humanitarian assistance and disaster relief organization with the Indonesian Navy off Lombok island. After that, from 22 May to 2 June, she called at Cam Ranh, Vietnam and participated in the activities of Pacific Partnership 2018. On 11 July the ship transported emergency supplies that Yokosuka City decided to provide in response to Kure City's request based on the mutual support agreement in the event of a disaster between the four former military port citiesand supplies requested by the Kure District General Manager to the Yokosuka District General Manager and arrived in Kure on the. In addition, the bathing facility on the ship was opened for the Ground Self-Defense Force members. From 5 to 19 October, Ōsumi took part in Japan-US joint training that was conducted in Tanegashima, Kagoshima Prefecture and the surrounding sea and airspace.

In 2021, Ōsumi,  alongside the warships JS Ise,  and other Japanese naval elements, took part in a 17-day joint training in the East China Sea, with the United States, Australia, and France.

Gallery

Citations

Osumi
Ships built by Mitsui Engineering and Shipbuilding
1996 ships